"Bless Your Heart" is a song made famous by country music singer Freddie Hart, and was the title track to Hart's 1972 album.  The song was his third No. 1 song on the country chart.

Country music writer Tom Roland wrote that the homonymy of Hart's last name ("Hart" and "heart") and the use of a common phrase ("bless your heart") in the lyrics provided the basis for the song, which is about a man who - despite his failings and feelings of unworthiness - expresses deep gratitude that his wife still loves him.
As the song grew in popularity, wrote Roland, Hart's fans "began saying it more and more in conjunction with (Hart) on stage."

Charts

See also
[ Allmusic — Bless Your Heart]

References

1972 singles
Freddie Hart songs
Songs written by Freddie Hart
Songs written by Jack Grayson